Declana feredayi is a species of moth in the family Geometridae. It is endemic to New Zealand. Adults of this species pollinate Hoheria Iyallii.

References

Moths of New Zealand
Moths described in 1877
Endemic fauna of New Zealand
Ennominae
Taxa named by Arthur Gardiner Butler
Endemic moths of New Zealand